C. A. Parsons and Company was a British engineering firm which was once one of the largest employers on Tyneside. The company became Reyrolle Parsons in 1968, merged with Clarke Chapman to form Northern Engineering Industries in 1977, and became part of Rolls-Royce in 1989. Today the company is part of Siemens Energy.

History 

The company was founded by Charles Algernon Parsons in 1889 to produce steam turbines, his own invention. At the beginning of the 20th century, the company was producing up to 50 turbines a year at its factory in Heaton in Newcastle upon Tyne.

Charles Algernon Parsons' son Algernon George "Tommy" Parsons joined the company as a director, but when he was called up for military service in the First World War, he was replaced by his sister, Rachel Mary Parsons, who was one of the first women to study engineering at University of Cambridge. During the First World War, the Parsons’ Works on Shields Road employed a large number of women on the factory floor. Following her brother's death during the war, Rachel Parsons did not resume her role as a director of the Heaton Works.

Sir Claude Gibb joined the company in the 1920s and became the company's chairman and managing director by the 1940s. During the Second World War the company assisted with the war effort to equip troops. Between 1945 and 1960 the company grew in size three-fold and large parts of the company's works at Heaton, Walkergate and Longbenton Works were rebuilt and expanded. In 1951 the original 1889 workshop was demolished and replaced with a six-storey office block. The company's heyday was in the 1960s, when the factory employed more than 7,000 people at its  site.

Parsons also patented and made novel searchlight mirrors between 1894 and 1923.

Nuclear power stations using Parsons steam turbines include Bradwell, Calder Hall, Dungeness, Heysham 2 and Oldbury in England and Chapelcross and Hunterston in Scotland.

Parsons took over the turbine and generator factories in Errith and Witton of the General Electric Company in the 1960s. The company merged with A. Reyrolle & Company to form Reyrolle Parsons in 1968. In 1977 Reyrolle Parsons merged with Clarke Chapman to form Northern Engineering Industries, which itself was acquired by Rolls-Royce in 1989.

The company survives today as part of Siemens Energy after Siemens acquired the business from Rolls-Royce in 1997. The Heaton Works site was renamed as the CA Parsons Works in honour of its founder. In the 2000s the operations at the Heaton works were severely cut to focus mainly on the servicing side of the business, concentrating manufacturing operations at the company's factories in Mülheim and Budapest.

Preserved turbines 
Parsons turbines are on display in several museums in the UK, and across the world. These include the Discovery Museum in Newcastle, the Science Museum in London, and the Electric Power and Historical Museum, in Yokohama, Japan.

See also 

 Parsons Marine Steam Turbine Company
 Grubb Parsons
 Mechanical Engineering Heritage (Japan) No. 4; Parsons Steam Turbine, made in 1908, upon technical licensed to Mitsubishi-Japan in 1904.

References

Siemens
Manufacturing companies established in 1889
Manufacturing companies disestablished in 1997
British companies established in 1889
British companies disestablished in 1997
1889 establishments in England
1997 disestablishments in England
Engine manufacturers of the United Kingdom
Manufacturing companies based in Newcastle upon Tyne
Marine engine manufacturers
Steam turbines
Steam turbine manufacturers
1989 mergers and acquisitions